
Olesno County is a unit of territorial administration and local government (powiat) in Opole Voivodeship, south-western Poland. It came into being on January 1, 1999, as a result of the Polish local government reforms passed in 1998.

As of 2019 its total population is 64,411. The most populated towns are Olesno with 9,374 inhabitants and Praszka with 7,655 inhabitants.

Neighbouring counties
Olesno County is bordered by Wieruszów County and Wieluń County to the north, Kłobuck County to the east, Lubliniec County to the south-east, Strzelce County to the south, Opole County to the south-west, and Kluczbork County to the west.

Administrative division
The county is subdivided into seven gminas (four urban-rural and three rural). These are listed in the following table, in descending order of population.

References

 
Olesno